Russia has the fourth-largest exclusive economic zone of  with  from its shores.

Geography

The EEZ borders with Norway, Finland, Sweden, Estonia, Lithuania and Poland to the west, the United States to the east, Japan, North Korea and South Korea to the south east and Azerbaijan, Kazakhstan, Georgia, Turkey and Ukraine to the south.

Disputes

Active

Japan
There is a longstanding dispute with Japan over the southern part of the Kuril islands. The dispute dates back to the Soviet Union and the Yalta Agreement (February 1945). The United States maintains that until a peace treaty between Japan and Russia is concluded, the disputed Northern Territories remain under Russian control via General Order No. 1.

Resolved

Norway
 In 2010, the Norway and Russia dispute of both territorial sea and EEZ with regard to the Svalbard archipelago as it affects Russia's EEZ due to its unique treaty status was resolved. A treaty was agreed in principle in April 2010 between the two states and subsequently officially ratified, resolving this demarcation dispute. The agreement was signed in Murmansk on 15 September 2010.

See also
 Geography of Russia
 Exclusive economic zone of Japan
 Exclusive economic zone of Poland

References

Russia
Borders of Russia
Economy of Russia
Japan–Russia relations